Dara and Ed's Great Big Adventure is a BBC Two TV show containing the events of Dara Ó Briain and Ed Byrne as they journey the Pan-American Highway.

External links

BBC television comedy
2010s British travel television series